Eupithecia perolivata is a moth in the  family Geometridae. It is found in Peru.

The wingspan is about 22 mm. The forewings are dull olive luteous, somewhat thinly scaled. The outer half of the wing from just beyond the large black cell-spot, is of a darker hue than the basal part. The hindwings are similar to the forewings.

References

Moths described in 1906
perolivata
Moths of South America